Pale Horses is the sixth studio album by American indie rock band mewithoutYou. The record was produced by Will Yip.

On June 10, 2015, the record became available for streaming on Vices Noisey website.

The artwork was painted in 1978 by Vasily Kafanov, who also painted the artwork for the band's previous five albums.

Track listing
Music by mewithoutYou, lyrics by Aaron Weiss.

Weekly charts

References

2015 albums
MewithoutYou albums
Albums produced by Will Yip